Tommy Tucker (born Robert Higginbotham; March 5, 1933 – January 22, 1982) was an American blues singer-songwriter and pianist. He is best known for the 1964 hit song, "Hi-Heel Sneakers", that went to No. 11 on the Billboard Hot 100 chart, and peaked at No. 23 in the UK Singles Chart.

Early life
Tucker was born Robert Higginbotham, to Leroy and Mary Higginbotham, the fifth of eleven children, in Springfield, Ohio, United States.

Career
Tucker released "Hi-Heel Sneakers" in 1964, which was a hit both in the US and the UK. He released an album, also entitled Hi-Heel Sneakers, on Checker Records that same year. His follow-up single, "Long Tall Shorty", was less successful. Musicians that played on his albums and singles included Louisiana Red, Willie Dixon and Donny Hathaway. In the 1970s, he began releasing previously unissued material on the English label Red Lightnin'. This was combined with his work for Big Bear Records, featuring on their American Blues Legends '75 album and tour.

Tucker co-wrote a song with Atlantic Records founder executive Ahmet Ertegun, called "My Girl (I Really Love Her So)".  Tucker left the music industry in the late 1960s, taking a position as a real estate agent in New Jersey. He also did freelance writing for a local newspaper in East Orange, New Jersey, writing of the plight and ignorance of black males in America, and the gullibility and exploitation of African Americans in general by the white-dominated media.

Death
Tucker died in 1982 at the age of 48 at College Hospital in Newark, New Jersey, from inhaling carbon tetrachloride while refinishing the hardwood floors of his home, though his death has been alternatively attributed to food poisoning.

Discography

Singles

Albums 

 1964: Hi-Heel Sneakers (Checker)
 1978: Live + Well (Ornament)
 1978: Mother Tucker (Red Lightnin')
 1982: The Rocks Is My Pillow - The Cold Ground Is My Bed (Red Lightnin')

Appears On 

 1975: American Blues Legends '75 (Big Bear)

References

External links

Dispatch.com

1933 births
1982 deaths
Singers from Ohio
Musicians from Springfield, Ohio
American blues singers
American blues pianists
American male pianists
Songwriters from Ohio
RCA Victor artists
Apex Records artists
20th-century American singers
20th-century American pianists
20th-century American male singers
American male songwriters